Akonolinga is a town and commune situated in Cameroon's Centre Province, with a population of roughly 21,300.

It lies on the Nyong River, due east of the capital Yaoundé. The town is home to FS d'Akonolinga football club, of the Cameroon Premiere Division.

References 

 Akonolinga statistics at World Gazetteer

Populated places in Centre Region (Cameroon)
Communes of Cameroon